The 2017–18 Eredivisie was the 62nd season of the Eredivisie since its establishment in 1955. The season began on 11 August 2017 and concluded on 6 May 2018; the Europa League and relegation play-offs took place later that month. Feyenoord were the defending champions from the previous season. On 15 April 2018, PSV became champions for the 24th time after defeating their closest rival Ajax 3–0 at the Philips Stadion.

Teams 
A total of 18 teams took part in the league: The best fifteen teams from the 2016–17 season, two promotion/relegation playoff winners (Roda JC and NAC Breda) and the 2016–17 Eerste Divisie champions (VVV-Venlo).

Stadiums and locations

Personnel and kits 

Note: Flags indicate national team as has been defined under FIFA eligibility rules. Players and Managers may hold more than one non-FIFA nationality.

Managerial changes

Standings

Results

Season statistics

Top scorers 

Updated to match(es) played on 6 May 2018.
Source: nos.nl (reliable) , Soccerway (unreliable)

Hat-tricks

Assists 

Updated to match(es) played on 6 May 2018.
Source: nos.nl (reliable) , Soccerway (unreliable)

Discipline 
Most yellow cards: 11
Thomas Lam (Twente)

Most red cards: 2
Adil Auassar (Roda JC)
Wilfried Kanon (ADO Den Haag)
Hirving Lozano (PSV)

Awards

Monthly awards

Play-offs

European competition 

Four teams will play for a spot in the 2018–19 UEFA Europa League second qualifying round.

Key: * = Play-off winners, (a) = Wins because of away goals rule, (e) = Wins after extra time in second leg, (p) = Wins after penalty shoot-out.

Promotion/relegation play-offs 
Ten teams, two from the Eredivisie and eight from the Eerste Divisie, will play for two spots in the 2018–19 Eredivisie, the remaining eight teams will play in the 2018–19 Eerste Divisie.

Key: * = Play-off winners, (a) = Wins because of away goals rule, (e) = Wins after extra time in second leg, (p) = Wins after penalty shoot-out.

References

External links 
 

2016–17
Neth
1